Thiruvonam is a Taluk town in Thanjavur district in the Indian state of Tamil Nadu

Geography
It has an average elevation of 36 metres (120 feet).

Demographics
A small town located south of Thanjavur, has population approximately 1000. Thiruvonam is a panchayat union comprises more than 20 small villages around and far. North East boundary of its panchayat union lies right in the suburb of Thanjavur called Mariamman Kovil. Currently, in the process of transforming itself into a separate Taluk. Mrs. Uma maheshwari being current chairman of panchayat union. Mr. T.thangadurai being the councilor of the union. History of this little town dates back to early 1000 A.D.. It was one of the important places of pilgrimage for Cholas dynasty. MuthuThangappa Football club and festival of temples of Muthumariamman are widely regarded. Thiru.Muthu Thangappa was a well known panchayat Union Chairman.

Politics
Thiruvonam assembly constituency is part of Thanjavur (Lok Sabha constituency).

References

See also
Onam

Cities and towns in Thanjavur district